(reformed) or  (traditional) is a German proverbial expression which translates as "there must be order". The idea of "order" is generally recognized as a key cliche for describing German culture. Franz von Papen, for instance, cited it in 1932 as Frederick the Great's "classic expression". As a slogan used by Paul von Hindenburg, it became "world famous" in 1930, according to The New York Times. A longer version is contained in a mid-19th century collection of proverbs where the title is a Wellerism:  (in English: "Order must be, said Hans, as they took him to the prison)."

Similarly, a proverb says  meaning "he who keeps order is just too lazy to spend his time searching".

Present interpretation of the expression distorts its original meaning. The expression was introduced by Martin Luther as Ordnung muss sein unter den Leuten ("Law must be among people"), Ordnung in the sense of True Law of God as opposed to human rules, for Orden und Regeln sind nichts ("Orders and rules are nothing") (on the same page) and Liebe zu Geld... ist nicht Gottes Werk oder Ordnung (Love for money... is not God's work or “Ordnung”).

Minor or petty offenses are called  (meaning "offense", or rather "contrarity to (public) order", or indeed the American (among others) similar concept of disorderly conduct).

In popular culture
The proverb forms part of the title of an early 2000s German television sitcom, "Hausmeister Krause – Ordnung muss sein", set in a Cologne housing development and starring Tom Gerhardt as Hausmeister Krause, a janitor with an authoritarian streak.

References

Proverbs
Slogans
Political quotes
1930s neologisms
German words and phrases